Tennisz és Golf (English: Tennis and Golf) was a Hungarian not-for-profit magazine published from 1929 to 1932 by the Hungarian Lawn Tennis Association aiming to popularize the sports of tennis and golf in Hungary. The editorial board was headed by the famous Hungarian tennis player Béla von Kehrling. The publication scheduled varied, starting from bimonthly and ending monthly, but some months had up to three issues while others had only one.

References

External links
All issues of Tennisz és Golf @ Elektronikus Periodika Archivum 

Golf magazines
Tennis magazines
Defunct magazines published in Hungary
Magazines published in Hungary
Hungarian-language magazines
Magazines established in 1929
Magazines disestablished in 1932
Magazines published in Budapest